Dinner With Fred is an American live action short film. The film's run time is approximately 23 minutes. It was written and directed by Ben Proudfoot and produced by Alex Kefalos, Matthew Quandt, and Aaron Rabkin. The film was shot on 35mm Kodak film stock using Panavision cameras by director of photography Josh Lipton.

Outline
During World War II Fred Conrad (Adam John Harrington) was taken from a troop train in Europe and sent home to Canada to use his pre-war chicken raising skills to stop war-time food shortages. Fred and his wife Hilda (Austin Highsmith) turn  a misfortunate change-of-plans into a career in humane poultry science that proves to hold meaning and purpose beyond Fred's wildest dreams. Supporting performances by Scott Lowell, Ron Orbach and Scott Laufer, the story shows what it means to serve one's country, even in unexpected ways.

About
Dinner with Fred was created by a diverse group of more than a hundred individuals, ranging from first-time student filmmakers to seasoned Oscar-winners including (Kevin Haney, Driving Miss Daisy and Greg A. Watkins, Dances with Wolves); writer and director Ben Proudfoot, and produced by Alex Kefalos, Matthew Quandt and Aaron Rabkin.

Casting director Scott David, C.S.A. assembled a  cast of thirty professional actors including Adam Harrington and Austin Highsmith.

Produced independently, Dinner with Fred was shot in the summer of 2010 in Fillmore, Los Angeles, and Fort Bragg, California, where the cast and crew recreated 1944 Canada with an authentic period steam locomotive and dozens of costumed extras. One of the most thrilling moments of the production was when composer Kyle Malkin conducted his award-winning original score for an orchestra composed of John Williams’ players, thanks to music contractor Peter Rotter.

After premiering in Los Angeles in January 2011, Dinner with Fred began its successful nationwide festival run, garnering numerous awards and accolades. An independent short film of unprecedented scope, Dinner with Fred qualified for consideration for the 2011 Academy Awards in the Best Live Action Short Film category.

Awards
Best Short Film: Tulsa International Film Festival
Best Director (Short Film): Tulsa International Film Festival
Best Short Film: Flint Film Festival
Best Picture: Southern California Business Film Festival
Best Director: Southern California Business Film Festival
Best Actor (Adam John Harrington): Southern California Business Film Festival
Best Original Score: Van Wert Independent Film Festival
Semi-Finalist: Angelus Student Film Festival
Winner (Student Short): Redemptive Film Festival
Official Selection: LA Shorts Fest
Official Selection: The Rome International Film Festival
Official Selection: Rumschpringe Short Film Festival
Official Selection: Film Stories Student Film Festival

References

External links
 Official Website
 
 Facebook Page

2011 films
American student films
2011 drama films
2011 short films
American drama short films
2010s English-language films
2010s American films